Hamilton South was a federal electoral district represented in the House of Commons of Canada from 1953 to 1965. It was located in the province of Ontario. This riding was created in 1952, from parts of Hamilton East, Hamilton West and Wentworth ridings.

It consisted of the part of the city of Hamilton lying east of Ottawa Street, the brow of the mountain, the part of the city south of the brow and west of Ottawa Street.

The electoral district was abolished in 1966 when it was redistributed between Hamilton East, Hamilton Mountain, Hamilton—Wentworth and ridings.

Members of Parliament 

This riding elected the following members of the House of Commons:

Election results

|}

|}

|}

|}

|}

|}

See also 

 List of Canadian federal electoral districts
 Past Canadian electoral districts

External links 
Riding history from the Library of Parliament

Former federal electoral districts of Ontario